Guradamole is the name of two woredas, or districts, in Ethiopia:

 Guradamole, Somali (woreda)
 Guradamole, Oromia (woreda)